Sect In Sgt is the first EP by Trickfinger, the alias of musician John Frusciante. The EP was released on July 30, 2012 through Neurotic Yell Records as a free download on BandCamp.

On November 24, 2015, Frusciante released the full, unedited version of the track via his own, official SoundCloud and Bandcamp pages.

Track listing

References

External links

John Frusciante EPs
2012 EPs